Buszkowice may refer to the following places in Poland:
Buszkowice, Lower Silesian Voivodeship (south-west Poland)
Buszkowice, Subcarpathian Voivodeship (south-east Poland)
Buszkowice, Świętokrzyskie Voivodeship (south-central Poland)